The Basque  is a single-reed woodwind instrument consisting of a single reed, two small diameter melody pipes with finger holes and a bell traditionally made from animal horn. Additionally, a reed cap of animal horn is placed around the reed to contain the breath and allow circular breathing for constant play. In the Basque language, an alboka player is called . The alboka is usually used to accompany a tambourine singer.

Although the alboka is native to the Basque region, similar instruments can be found around Spain including Madrid, Asturias, and Castile and Andalusia, but in those cases they only have a single pipe.  The name is derived from the Arabic , which means "the trumpet" or "the horn".

Hornpipes are made of a single reed, a small diameter melody pipe with fingerholes, and a bell traditionally made of animal horn.  An animal horn reed cap usually encompasses the idioglot reed. These instruments are descended from single-reed idioglot instruments found in Egypt as early as 2700 BCE. During the Old Kingdom in Egypt (2778-2723 BCE), memets were depicted on the reliefs of seven tombs at Saqqarra, six tombs at Giza, and the pyramids of Queen Khentkaus.  Horns were later added to the reed pipe to increase resonance. Horn caps were also added around the reed, and the player would blow into the hornpipe to activate the reed instead of holding it in their mouth.

The alboka has two cane pipes, a wood handle, and a horn at each end. It may be descended from the Moroccan double hornpipe, which has two cane pipes, each fitted with a cow horn. The alboka was established in Spain by the end of the 13th-century.

Notable  players are Ibon Koteron and Alan Griffin.

Gallery

See also
 Basque music
 Ibon Koteron
 Hornpipe (musical instrument)
Stock-and-horn, a similar Scottish instrument
Pibgorn, a similar Welsh instrument
 Erkencho

Bibliography
 Barrenchea, José Mariano y Riezu, P. Jorge de, "Alboka. Entorno folklórico" Archivo Padre Donostia. Lecaroz (Navarra), 1976.

Discography
 Alboka (musical group) Lorius
 Bidaia 
 Kepa Junkera & Ibon Koteron

References

External links

Hornpipes
Basque musical instruments